In music, Op. 114 stands for Opus number 114. Compositions that are assigned this number include:

 Brahms – Clarinet Trio
 Dvořák – Rusalka
 Prokofiev – Flourish, Mighty Land
 Schumann – 3 Lieder für 3 Frauenstimmen
 Strauss – Liebeslieder, Op. 114